Carel Johan du Plessis (born 24 June 1960) is a former South African rugby union coach and player.

Playing career

Du Plessis played for Western Province and the Springboks, his skills earning him the nickname the Prince of Wings. Capped 12 times, he scored 4 tries for the Springboks, but his international career was curtailed by the sports boycott against apartheid South Africa.

Test history

Coaching career

In late February 1997, du Plessis was appointed coach of the Springboks, succeeding Andre Markgraaff, despite a lack of coaching experience. He led the team to defeat in both the British and Irish Lions' 1997 tour and the 1997 Tri-Nations, before being sacked and replaced by Nick Mallett, his last game as coach being a 61–22 win over Australia. He was subsequently an assistant coach for Western Province and the Stormers, with Gert Smal.

Personal

Du Plessis is the brother of Michael du Plessis and Willie du Plessis, both former Springboks, father of Jean-Luc du Plessis, who plays for the Stormers, and uncle of Daniël du Plessis, a former South Africa U20 player.

He has undergone three major surgeries after a brain tumour was discovered in January 2019.

See also
List of South Africa national rugby union players – Springbok no. 523

References

1960 births
Living people
South Africa national rugby union team coaches
South African rugby union coaches
South African rugby union players
South Africa international rugby union players
Western Province (rugby union) players
People from Somerset East
Rugby union players from the Eastern Cape
Rugby union centres
Rugby union wings